Krivovsky is a rural locality (a khutor) in Dobrinskoye Rural Settlement, Uryupinsky District, Volgograd Oblast, Russia. The population was 4 as of 2010. There are 3 streets.

Geography 
Krivovsky is located in the valley of the Khopyor River, 25 km southwest of Uryupinsk (the district's administrative centre) by road. Sazonovsky is the nearest rural locality.

References 

Rural localities in Uryupinsky District